Brooklands Hockey Club also known as Brooklands MU (men) and Brooklands Poynton (women) is a field hockey club that is based at the Brooklands Sports Club  at Georges Road in Sale, Cheshire.

The club runs seven men's teams (six senior and one veterans) and four women's teams, four junior teams and three mini teams. The men's first XI play in the Men's England Hockey League and the women's first XI play in the Women's England Hockey League.

History
Originally a cricket club on land owned by the Brooks family the hockey element arrived in 1889. Brooklands Hockey Club merged with the Manchester University hockey team in 2002  and the ladies section of the club merged with the Poynton Ladies Club in 2009.

Major honours
 2013–14 Men's Cup Runner Up

Notable players

Men's internationals

References

English field hockey clubs
Sport in Trafford